Mezzana Mortigliengo is a comune (municipality) in the Province of Biella in the Italian region Piedmont, located about  northeast of Turin and about  northeast of Biella nearby the Lago delle Piane.

References

Cities and towns in Piedmont